Admiral Prince Vudhijaya Chalermlabh, Prince of Singha (5 December 1883 – 18 October, 1947) was a member of Chakri Dynasty. He served as Minister of Defence and commander of Royal Thai Army between 1931 and 1932. Before then he served as the Minister of the Navy of Royal Thai Navy between 1924 and 1932.

He had trained in the British Royal Navy and was serving as a midshipman in the Mediterranean when in April 1904 he was rescued from drowning off the coast of Sardinia by the efforts of Captain Christopher Cradock of HMS Bacchante.

Ancestry

References
 

1883 births
1947 deaths
19th-century Thai people
Thai male Phra Ong Chao
Vudhijaya family
Commanders-in-chief of the Royal Thai Army
Ministers of Defence of Thailand
Thai admirals
Knights Grand Cordon of the Order of Chula Chom Klao
Recipients of the Dushdi Mala Medal, Pin of Arts and Science
Children of Chulalongkorn
19th-century Chakri dynasty
20th-century Chakri dynasty
Sons of kings